KWOC (930 AM, "News/Talk 930") is an American radio station licensed to serve the community of Poplar Bluff, Missouri. The station, established in 1938, is currently owned by Max Media's Mississippi River Radio and the broadcast license is held by MRR License LLC.

It broadcasts a news/talk radio format. Syndicated programming includes Coast to Coast AM with George Noory, The Osgood File with Charles Osgood, The Dave Ramsey Show, The Rush Limbaugh Show, The Sean Hannity Show, The Glenn Beck Program, and The Mike Gallagher Show.

The station was assigned the call sign "KWOC" by the Federal Communications Commission (FCC).

References

External links
KWOC official website
Mississippi River Radio

Radio Locator Information for K227BK

WOC
News and talk radio stations in the United States
Radio stations established in 1938
Butler County, Missouri
1938 establishments in Missouri
Max Media radio stations